The  Truman Bulldogs football program represents Truman State University in college football and competes in the Division II level of the National Collegiate Athletics Association (NCAA). In 2013, Truman became a member of the Great Lakes Valley Conference and has remained in the league. Prior to this, Truman was in the Mid-America Intercollegiate Athletics Association from 1924 to 2012. TSU's home games are played at Stokes Stadium in Kirksville, Missouri.

History
Truman's football program dates back to 1900 when the program went 3–2–1. Since their inaugural season, the Bulldogs have claimed 27 conference championships.

Conference affiliations
 Mid-America Intercollegiate Athletics Association (1924–2012)
 Great Lakes Valley Conference (2013–present)

Stadium

The Bulldogs have played their home games at Stokes Stadium since 1930. Stokes Stadium was named for a former physics professor. The current capacity of the stadium is at 4,000.

Championships

Conference championship seasons

Bowl games

References

External links
 

 
American football teams established in 1900
1900 establishments in Missouri